Tauntonia (minor planet designation: 581 Tauntonia) is a dark Alauda asteroid from the outer region of the asteroid belt, approximately 61 kilometers in diameter.

The asteroid is a member of the Alauda family, a large family of typically bright carbonaceous asteroids and named after its parent body, 702 Alauda.

References

External links
 Lightcurve plot of 581 Tauntonia, Palmer Divide Observatory, B. D. Warner (2000)
 Asteroid Lightcurve Database (LCDB), query form (info )
 Dictionary of Minor Planet Names, Google books
 Asteroids and comets rotation curves, CdR – Observatoire de Genève, Raoul Behrend
 Discovery Circumstances: Numbered Minor Planets (1)-(5000) – Minor Planet Center
 
 

000581
Discoveries by Joel Hastings Metcalf
Named minor planets
000581
19051224